Uttermost (foaled 1942 in Ontario) was a Canadian Thoroughbred racehorse who in 1945 won the three races that later formed the official Canadian Triple Crown series.

Bred and raced by liquor magnate Harry C. Hatch, Uttermost was trained by Cecil Howard and ridden by future Canadian Horse Racing Hall of Fame jockey Bobby Watson.

He was the top two-year-old in Canada and was the country's top horse in 1945 at age three.

References
 Uttermost's pedigree and partial racing stats

1942 racehorse births
Racehorses bred in Canada
Racehorses trained in Canada
King's Plate winners
Triple Crown of Thoroughbred Racing winners
Thoroughbred family 8-f